Alexander Mark Salmon (born 9 July 1994) is an English footballer who is currently plays for Green Gully SC in the National Premier Leagues Victoria in Australia. He has previously played for Alloa Athletic, Carlisle United, Celtic Nation and Workington, along with Western Australian clubs Armadale, Bayswater City and Inglewood United.

Career
Salmon began his career with Carlisle United and made his professional debut on 20 April 2013 in a 3–1 defeat against Bournemouth.

On 30 August 2013, Salmon joined Scottish Championship side Alloa Athletic on a six-month loan deal. On 17 December 2013, the loan was ended after four months. Following his return to Carlisle he was released.

In January 2014 Salmon joined Conference North side Workington on a one-month deal but didn't get to play due to postponements because of the weather. After his contract expired he left and signed for Northern League Division One side Celtic Nation until the end of the 2013–2014 season.

Salmon returned to Workington A.F.C for the 2014–2015 season and made 28 appearances and scoring 4 goals in all competitions.

Salmon signed on with National Premier League side Armadale SC at the beginning of 2016 but transferred mid-season to Bayswater City SC. He switched to Inglewood United for the 2017 campaign. After taking out back-to-back golden boots for Inglewood, Salmon moved to Victoria to join Green Gully SC in the National Premier Leagues Victoria for 2019.

References

External links

Alex Salmon NPL Player Statistics

1994 births
Living people
Sportspeople from Birkenhead
English footballers
Association football forwards
Carlisle United F.C. players
Alloa Athletic F.C. players
English Football League players
Scottish Professional Football League players
Workington A.F.C. players
Celtic Nation F.C. players
Armadale SC players
Expatriate soccer players in Australia